Chilaw is a large town in Puttalam District, North Western Province, Sri Lanka. It is governed by an urban council. The town is located 80 kilometres away from Colombo via Negombo.

Etymology 
The name Chilaw derives its name from its Tamil name Cilāpam, meaning pearl fishery.

Our Lady of Mount Carmel Cathedral
 
The seat of the Chilaw Diocese, this cathedral has a history of more than two centuries. According to legend, 200 years ago, most of what is now Chilaw Town was covered by a forest. A woman was searching for firewood and heard the sound of a lady speaking, "Please take me". She stopped her work and searched for the source of the sound. A statue of Mother Mary was on a tree. The woman took the statue and handed over it to the parish priest who recognized it as Our Lady of Mount Carmel. Many believe that this same statue now stands in the cathedral. Many in Chilaw celebrate the feast of Our Lady of Mount Carmel is celebrated every July. During the feast season of Our Lady Of Mount Carmel, the town is fully decorated in homage to Mother Mary.

The visit of Mahatma Gandhi
Mahathma Gandhi, the 'Father of India,' visited Chilaw in November 1927 on his first and only journey to Sri Lanka when it was called Ceylon. This was a historic visit - Gandhi was invited to Chilaw by the freedom fighters Charles Edgar Corea and his brother Victor Corea who lived in the town. The brothers founded the Chilaw Association and the Ceylon National Congress and campaigned hard for the independence of Ceylon. The Corea family have had a strong link with Chilaw. There is a saying in Sri Lanka that Chilaw is well known for the three 'C's' - crabs, coconuts and Coreas.

Munneswaram Temple

Tourists visit the well known Hindu temple located in Munneswaram, situated in the historic Demala Pattuva ("Tamil division") region of Puttalam District. The main festivals celebrated at the temple include Navarathri and Sivarathri. The former is a nine-day-long festival in honour of the presiding Goddess, while the latter is an over-night observation in honour of Lord Shiva. In addition to these two Hindu festivals, the temple observes the four-week-long Munneswaram festival which is attended by both Hindus and Buddhists. During the festival, traders sell hand-painted clay models of animals such as deer, money box tills and 'raban' (traditional hand drums) from stalls all over the town.

See also

Edmund Peiris (Bishop of Chilaw)
Chilaw Marians Cricket Club

References

Bibliography
The Mahavamsa - History of Sri Lanka, The Great Chronicle of Sri Lanka
Ceylon and the Portuguese, 1505-1658  By P.E. Peiris (1920)
Great Sinhalese Men and Women of History - Edirille Bandara (Domingos Corea) By John M. Senaveratna, (1937)
A History of Sri Lanka By Professor K.M.De Silva (1981)
Twentieth Century Impressions of Ceylon: Its History, People, Commerce, Industries and Resources By A.W. Wright, Asian Educational Services,India; New Ed edition (15 December 2007)

Maps
Detailed map of Chilaw and Sri Lanka